{{Infobox football club season
| club               = Jacksonville Armada
| season             = 2017
| manager            = Mark Lowry
| mgrtitle           = Head coach
| chrtitle           = Owner
| chairman           = Mark Frisch
| stadium            = Hodges Stadium
| league             = NASL
| league result      = Spring:'4th   Fall:'  Combined:' | cup1               = U.S. Open Cup
| cup1 result        = Fourth Round vs Charleston Battery
| league topscorer   = 
| season topscorer   = 
| highest attendance = 
| lowest attendance  = 
| average attendance =
| prevseason  = 2016
| nextseason  = 2018
| pattern_la1 = FFFFFF
| pattern_b1  = FFFFFF
| pattern_ra1 = FFFFFF
| leftarm1    = FFFFFF
| body1       = FFFFFF
| rightarm1   = FFFFFF
| shorts1     = FFFFFF
| socks1      = FFFFFF
| pattern_la2 = 
| pattern_b2  = _whitehorizontal
| pattern_ra2 = 
| leftarm2    = 191970
| body2       = 191970
| rightarm2   = 191970
| shorts2     = 191970
| socks2      = 191970
| American    = true
}}
The 2017 Jacksonville Armada FC season is the club's third season of existence. The club will play in North American Soccer League, the second tier of the American soccer pyramid.

Roster

 Transfers 

WinterIn:Out:SummerIn:Out:'''

 Competitions 
 NASL Spring season 

 Standings 

 Results summary 

 Results by round 

 Results 

 NASL Fall season 

 Standings 

 Results summary 

 Results by round 

 Results 

 U.S. Open Cup 

Squad statistics

Appearances and goals

|-
|colspan="14"|Players who left Jacksonville Armada during the season:''

|-
|}

Goal scorers

Disciplinary record

References

External links
 

Jacksonville Armada FC seasons
American soccer clubs 2017 season
2017 North American Soccer League season
2017 in sports in Florida